Tiétar is a river of Spain. It is a tributary of the Tagus. Its source is in the Sierra de Gredos mountain range and has a length of 170 km. It flows into the Tagus at Monfragüe.

See also 
 Monfragüe
 List of rivers of Spain

References

External links
Monfragüe National Park

Rivers of Spain
Rivers of Castile and León
Tributaries of the Tagus
Geography of the Province of Ávila
Geography of the Province of Toledo
Geography of the Province of Cáceres
Rivers of Castilla–La Mancha
Rivers of Extremadura